The southern flying squirrel or the assapan (Glaucomys volans) is one of three species of the genus Glaucomys and one of three flying squirrel species found in North America. It is found in deciduous and mixed woods in the eastern half of North America, from southeastern Canada to Florida. Disjunct populations of this species have been recorded in the highlands of Mexico, Guatemala, and Honduras.

Description and ecology

Southern flying squirrels have grey-brown fur on top with darker flanks and are a cream color underneath. They have large dark eyes and flattened tails. They have a furry membrane called a patagium that extends between the front and rear legs and is used to glide through the air. The tail can be .

Southern flying squirrels are nocturnal. They feed on fruit and nuts from trees such as red and white oak, hickory, and beech. They store food, especially acorns, for winter consumption. They also dine on insects, buds, mushrooms, mycorrhizal fungi, carrion, bird eggs, nestlings, and flowers. Predators include snakes, owls, hawks and raccoons. Domestic cats can also be potential predators.

Both in the wild and in captivity, they can produce two litters each year (with 2–7 young per litter). The gestation period is approximately 40 days. Young are born without fur or any capabilities of their own. Their ears open at 2 to 6 days old, and fur grows in by 7 days. Their eyes do not open until they are 24–30 days old. Mothers wean their young 65 days after they are born. The young then become fully independent at around 120 days of age.

Southern flying squirrels show substantial homing abilities and can return to their nests if artificially removed to distances of up to a kilometer. Their home ranges may be up to 40,000 square meters for females and double that for males, tending to be larger at the northern extreme of their range.

Exposure to southern flying squirrels has been linked to cases of epidemic typhus in humans. Typhus spread by flying squirrels is known as "sylvatic typhus" and the Centers for Disease Control and Prevention has documented a total of 39 such cases in the U.S. from 1976 to 2001. The squirrel acts as host to the Rickettsia prowazekii bacteria and transmission to humans is hypothesized to occur via aerosolized feces of the fleas and lice associated with G. volans.

Gliding

Flying squirrels do not actually fly, but rather glide using a membrane called a patagium. From atop of trees, flying squirrels can initiate glides from a running start  or from a stationary position by bringing their limbs under the body, retracting their heads, and then propelling themselves off the tree. It is believed that they use triangulation to estimate the distance of the landing area as they often lean out and pivot from side to side before jumping. Once in the air, they form an "X" with their limbs by spreading their long arms forward and out and their long legs backward and out, causing their membrane to stretch into a square-like shape  and glide down at angles of 30 to 40 degrees. They maneuver with great efficiency in the air, making 90 degree turns around obstacles if needed. Just before reaching a tree, they raise their flattened tails that abruptly changes their trajectory upwards, and point all of their limbs forward to create a parachute effect with the membrane in order to reduce the shock of landing. The limbs absorb the remainder of the impact, and the squirrels immediately run to the other side of the trunk or to the top of the tree in order to avoid any potential predators. Although graceful in flight, they are very clumsy walkers and if they happen to be on the ground in the presence of danger, they will prefer to hide rather than attempt to escape.

Habitat

The southern flying squirrel is found in eastern deciduous forests or mixed forests of North America.  Large hickory and beech trees are more abundant in intensively used areas of their home ranges. Also, maple and poplar, as well as oak trees make favorable habitat.  Although southern flying squirrels may be present in heavily wooded suburban regions, they never occur in large numbers in these areas.

The size of the home range of southern flying squirrels varies greatly.  Average home range estimates are 2.45 hectares, 9.0 hectares, and 16.0 hectares  for adult males, 1.95 hectares, 3.9 hectares, and 7.2 hectares  for adult females, and 0.61 hectares for juveniles. Significant overlap exists among the home ranges. Near the northern limit of the southern flying squirrels distribution, home range increases in size as mast-producing trees become more dispersed. This trend is also observed in fragmented forests where nesting and foraging areas become widely spaced.

Home range is larger in males than females possibly to increase the chance of encountering potential mates. Although males have a larger home range, female home ranges have been shown to increase by as much as 70 percent following the departure of the offspring.

Number of nesting sites does not influence the total number of flying squirrels but may influence which sex will be present. Male home ranges contain more food as they have been associated with a higher than expected number of large red oaks and white oaks, whereas female home ranges contained lower food resources and more abundant nesting sites possibly to avoid contact with other squirrels while raising the young.

Southern flying squirrels nest in natural cavities and woodpecker holes, or build nest out of leaves and twigs. Leaf nests are used as a refuge or a resting site and are used primarily in summer, whereas cavities are used for breeding and more intensively during winter.

Dens tend to be on the perimeter of the home range and situated away from clearings. To cross disturbances such as plantations and logged areas, southern flying squirrels prefer to use mature forest corridors over younger ones, suggesting that they are more sensitive to forest disturbances than previously believed.

Behavior

Southern flying squirrels are highly social mammals and have been observed flying and foraging together in large groups.  Additionally, they often aggregate together in dens, especially as seasonal temperatures decline in order to conserve energy. Compared to individuals who nest alone in winter, squirrels in aggregates can save 30 percent more energy.  Although southern flying squirrels do show a preference for relatedness, they are tolerant of nonrelated but familiar individuals, possibly because in addition to providing heat energy for the aggregation, outsiders will promote outbreeding.

Mull  stated that communal nesting may actually be detrimental during warm weather and is unnecessary in the southern parts of the species range. However, Layne and Raymond observed nest boxes in Florida and discovered that the southern populations also nest in large groups (up to 25 individuals) and that, compared to northern populations, the period of elevated communal nesting extended later in the spring. In this study, nest temperatures occasionally exceeded 38°C while the normal body temperature of southern flying squirrels varies between 36.3 and 38.9°C. Since southern populations breed later in the spring than northern populations, these findings suggests that communal nesting serves more than a thermoregulatory function and may actually play a role in the social organization of populations. Proposed advantages of aggregation include increased likelihood of mating, increased defense against predators, or increased foraging success.

Populations which nest together were found to be more highly related than expected by chance and it is believed this could be a form of kin selection since an individual's stored food may be beneficial for the survival of its relatives in the event of death.

Winterrowd and Weigl performed experiments in controlled conditions to determine whether memory, smell, random searching, or problem solving played the major role in retrieving hidden food. When burying dry nuts in dry substrate, no odors are present and spatial memory is the most effective retrieval mechanism, suggesting that there is no inclusive fitness involved in the hoarding behavior. However, once placed in a wet environment, smell becomes an effective means to retrieve the food and decreases the individuals advantage over the other members of the group. Experiments to determine whether a squirrel would steal from others in the group revealed that no particular pattern exists and that the hidden food is recovered according to its availability.

Sports and popular culture

Richmond Flying Squirrels - Eastern League affiliate of the San Francisco Giants.  This Virginia-based team draws its name, logo, and mascot from the southern flying squirrel.
The video games Pokémon Black and White take place in the Unova region (based on the eastern United States) and contain Emolga, an Electric/Flying type Pokémon based on the southern flying squirrel.

Footnotes

References

Arbogast, B. S. (1999). Mitochondrial DNA phylogeography of the New World flying squirrels (Glaucomys): implications for Pleistocene biogeography. Journal of Mammalogy 80: 142–155.
Fox, D. & Mulheisen, M. (1999): Animal Diversity Web - Glaucomys volans. Accessed May 20, 2005.
Fridell, R. A. & Litvaitis, J. A. (1991). Influence of resource distribution and abundance on home-range characteristics of southern flying squirrels. Canadian Journal of Zoology 69: 2589–2593.

Mitchell, L. R.; Carlile, L. D. & Chandler, C. R. (1999). Effects of southern flying squirrels on nest success of red-cockaded woodpeckers. Journal of Wildlife Management 63: 538–545.
Sawyer, S. L. & Rose, R. K. (1985). Homing in and ecology of the southern flying squirrel Glaucomys volans in southeastern Virginia. American Midland Naturalist 113: 238–244.
Stapp, P.; Pekins, P. J. & Mautz, W. W. (1991). Winter energy-expenditure and the distribution of southern flying squirrels. Canadian Journal of Zoology 69: 2548–2555.
Stone, K. D.; Heidt, G. A.; Baltosser, W. H. & Caster, P. T. (1996). Factors affecting nest box use by southern flying squirrels (Glaucomys volans) and gray squirrels (Sciurus carolinensis). American Midland Naturalist 135: 9-13.
Stone, K. D.; Heidt, G. A.; Caster, P. T. & Kennedy, M. L. (1997). Using geographic information systems to determine home range of the southern flying squirrel (Glaucomys volans). American Midland Naturalist 137: 106–111.
Taulman, J. F. (1999). Selection of nest trees by southern flying squirrels (Sciuridae: Glaucomys volans) in Arkansas. Journal of Zoology 248: 369–377.
Taulman, J. F.; Smith, K. G. & Thill, R. E. (1998). Demographic and behavioral responses of southern flying squirrels to experimental logging in Arkansas. Ecological Applications 8: 1144–1155.
Thomas, R. B. & Weigl, P.D. (1998). Dynamic foraging behavior in the southern flying squirrel (Glaucomys volans): test of a model. American Midland Naturalist 140: 264–270.

External links

 FlyingSquirrels.com
 National Flying Squirrel Association – Pet squirrel care.
 Smithsonian Wild: Glaucomys volans

Glaucomys
Fauna of the Eastern United States
Mammals of the United States
Mammals of Canada
Rodents of Central America
Mammals of Mexico
Southern flying squirrel
Southern flying squirrel